Arthur Hawthorne (born 1873, date of death unknown) was a New Zealand cricketer. He played in four first-class matches for Wellington from 1906 to 1910.

See also
 List of Wellington representative cricketers

References

External links
 

1873 births
Year of death missing
New Zealand cricketers
Wellington cricketers